Brigadier-General the Honourable Everard Baring  (5 December 1865 — 7 May 1932) was a British Army officer and Chairman of the Southern Railway.

Background early life
Baring was born in Kingston, Surrey, one of ten children of Edward Charles Baring, of the Baring family, by his wife, Louisa Emily Charlotte (née Bulteel), granddaughter of the 2nd Earl Grey. His father was created Baron Revelstoke in 1885, when Everard and his siblings received the style the Honourable. His older brother was the bankier John Baring (1863–1929; later 2nd Baron Revelstoke), and a younger brother was the dramatist and poet Maurice Baring (1874–1945). His sister Margaret Baring (1868–1906) married the 6th Earl Spencer and was great-grandmother to Diana, Princess of Wales.

Everard Baring was educated at Eton College and at the Royal Military College at Sandhurst.

Career
Baring was commissioned a lieutenant in the 10th Hussars on 23 August 1884, and promoted to a captain on 1 February 1890. His military career encompassed the Nile Expedition between 1897 and 1898, where he was mentioned in despatches twice, and following which he was promoted to major on 16 November 1898. He was Military Secretary to the Viceroy of India (Lord Curzon Of Kedleston) between 11 December 1899 and December 1905. Baring later served in the Great War and commanded a brigade in 1916.

After retirement from the military, he became a Director of the National Provincial Bank before becoming Chairman of the Southern Railway in 1924. He died in office in 1932, aged 66, from undisclosed causes.

Family
Baring married, on 15 September 1904, Lady Ulrica Duncombe, daughter of William Duncombe, 1st Earl Feversham and Mabel Violet née Graham.

He died at 26 Hyde Park, Middlesex. His remains are interred at St Peters Tandridge. His grave is located on the north side of the churchyard

Honours and awards
 Commander, Royal Victorian Order (1903)
 Commander, Order of the British Empire (1919)

References

1865 births
British Army brigadiers
Military personnel from Surrey
1932 deaths
Everard
British bankers
British Army generals of World War I
Southern Railway (UK) people
People associated with transport in London
People from Kingston upon Thames
People educated at Eton College
Graduates of the Royal Military College, Sandhurst
10th Royal Hussars officers
British Army personnel of the Mahdist War
Commanders of the Royal Victorian Order
Commanders of the Order of the British Empire
Younger sons of barons
Burials in England